The Stars Dance Tour was the first solo concert tour by American singer Selena Gomez in support of her solo debut studio album, Stars Dance (2013). Gomez performed songs from her solo debut album, as well as her releases with Selena Gomez & the Scene. The tour launched on August 14, 2013 and continued until March 9, 2014. It serves as the first tour of Gomez's career, visiting Europe and Dubai. The cancellation of The Stars Dance Tour in Asia and Australia was caused due to Gomez's diagnosis with Lupus in 2013, an auto-immune disease leading to high anxiety and depression.

Development 
On April 15, 2013, Gomez announced that she would be touring North America and Europe along with one show in Asia from August to November in support of her album Stars Dance. When asked about the tour, Gomez stated:
"It's going to be a bigger show. I’m excited. I’ve been dancing a lot and I just want to entertain people and I’m super stoked."
Gomez further added: "I kind of missed shows when it used to just be about the dancing and the performing as opposed to how big and elaborate the stage is so I kind of want to get back to that. My favorites were Britney Spears and Janet Jackson so I kind of want it to be a bit more dancing and make it about entertainment and about the show and the songs as opposed to how big the stage and effects are."

It was announced later that the tour would continue throughout Asia and Australia but in December 2013 Gomez released a statement saying that she decided to cancel the tour. Gomez stated:
"My fans are so important to me and I would never want to disappoint them. But it has become clear to me and those close to me that after many years of putting my work first, I need to spend some time on myself in order to be the best person I can be. To my fans, I sincerely apologize and I hope you guys know how much each and every one of you mean to me."

Concert synopsis 
The show begins with a video showing stars in outer space. The camera begins to zoom in on earth and down into a house where Gomez has fallen asleep after looking at star charts. The video then fades out to white, enlarges Gomez's face and shows her looking around at 4 mysterious doors that have appeared around here. She enters one containing stairs that lead to the stage and the real Gomez appears at the top of the real staircase in the center of the stage, performing "Bang Bang Bang" and dressed in white. After singing "Round & Round", Gomez welcomes everyone to the show and asks the audience for help singing the next song, "Like A Champion". Next, Gomez and her dancers perform a mashup of "B.E.A.T." and "Work" before exiting the stage.

A video interlude then plays, showing her entering another door that contains a video projector that begins to countdown. Gomez re-enters the stage wearing a sparkly, blue two-piece outfit to perform "Stars Dance". "Write Your Name" is next, during which the dancers form a heart of neon glow sticks around Gomez. After the song, Gomez asks the audience if anyone is celebrating a birthday by performing a medley of "Birthday" and Rihanna's "Birthday Cake". The lights go down as she slowly begins "Love You Like A Love Song" before the lights come up at the chorus and the song is performed at normal speed. Gomez then leaves the stage.

Another video interlude shows Gomez entering another door, this one containing potted trees and flowers, and a gift box at the end on a pedestal. She opens the gift box to reveal the sparkly microphone with her name on it that she always performs with. Camera flashes and news headlines appear, symbolizing the exposure and interest in Gomez's personal life. She returns to the stage in a black dress to perform "Love Will Remember". Next, Gomez sings a cover of "Dream" by Priscilla Ahn, while playing the harmonica. After a speech telling the audience to accept themselves for who they are and not to change for anyone, Gomez performs "Who Says" before leaving the stage.

The third video interlude shows Gomez opening the final door, which leads into a club. "Whiplash" begins to play before Gomez re-enters the stage in a sparkly, gold one-piece outfit. She and her dancers hang around on suspended ropes during the performance. As the lights fade, they return to focus on Gomez as she begins to sing "Naturally". "Undercover" is next,  with resonating sound waves displayed on the screen. A disco remix version of "A Year Without Rain" is also performed in select cities. Gomez then leaves the stage once more.

A final video clip displays Gomez sleeping at the desk again after looking at star charts. She awakes to reveal that the whole thing was a just a dream. "Come & Get It" begins to play before the real Gomez enters. After the song, she exits the stage again, only to re-enter to perform "Slow Down" as the music video plays in the background on the screen. Pink confetti blows out into the audience during the final chorus. She runs out onto the runway to acknowledge and thank the fans for coming to the show. She acknowledges the band and dancers before she runs to the top of the stage and makes her exit offstage as the music ends.

Set list 
This set list is representative of the show on November 6, 2013. It does not represent all concerts for the duration of the tour.

 "Bang Bang Bang"
 "Round & Round"
 "Like a Champion"
 "B.E.A.T." 
 "Stars Dance"
 "Write Your Name"
 "Birthday" / "Birthday Cake"
 "Roar"
 "Love You Like a Love Song"
 "Love Will Remember"
 "Dream"
 “Royals”
 "Who Says"
 "Whiplash"
 "Naturally"
 “Save The Day”
 "Undercover"
 "A Year Without Rain"

Encore
 "Come & Get It"
 "Slow Down"

Tour dates

Cancelled shows

Notes

References 

2013 concert tours
Selena Gomez concerts